Corrie Grant (14 November 1850 – December 1924) was a British journalist, barrister and Liberal Party politician who served as the Member of Parliament (MP) for the Rugby division of Warwickshire from 1900 to 1910.

Early life
Grant was born in Kettleburgh, Suffolk to Frances Ann and James Brighton Grant, a brewer and maltster who had been imprisoned for non-payment of Church Rates. He was educated at the City of London School, worked as a journalist, and was called to the bar in 1877 at the Middle Temple, after which he practised on the North Eastern Circuit.

Political career
Grant stood for Parliament four times before winning a seat. He stood unsuccessfully in Woodstock at the by-election in July 1885, in Birmingham West at the 1892 general election, in Rugby at the 1895 general election, and in Harrow at a by-election in 1899.

He was elected at the 1900 general election as MP for Rugby, re-elected in 1906, and stood down from the House of Commons at the January 1910 general election.

Family
Grant was married in 1885 to Annie Adams of Plymouth.

Notes and references

External links
Photographs of Corrie Grant in the National Portrait Gallery

1850 births
1924 deaths
Liberal Party (UK) MPs for English constituencies
UK MPs 1900–1906
UK MPs 1906–1910
Members of the Middle Temple
People educated at the City of London School